Kuzmino is a rural locality (a village) in Butylitskoye Rural Settlement, Melenkovsky District, Vladimir Oblast, Russia. The population was 107 as of 2010. There are 2 streets.

Geography 
Kuzmino is located 28 km north of Melenki (the district's administrative centre) by road. Dobryatino is the nearest rural locality.

References 

Rural localities in Melenkovsky District